The 2021 Copa Sevilla was a professional tennis tournament played on clay courts. It was the 23rd edition of the tournament which was part of the 2021 ATP Challenger Tour. It took place in Seville, Spain between 6 and 12 September 2021.

Singles main-draw entrants

Seeds

 1 Rankings are as of 30 August 2021.

Other entrants
The following players received wildcards into the singles main draw:
  Pablo Llamas Ruiz
  Álvaro López San Martín
  Nikolás Sánchez Izquierdo

The following players received entry into the singles main draw using protected rankings:
  Filippo Baldi
  Julian Lenz

The following players received entry into the singles main draw as alternates:
  Julian Ocleppo
  Genaro Alberto Olivieri

The following players received entry from the qualifying draw:
  Luciano Darderi
  Lucas Gerch
  Emilio Nava
  Benjamín Winter López

Champions

Singles

 Pedro Martínez def.  Roberto Carballés Baena 6–4, 6–1.

Doubles

 David Vega Hernández /  Mark Vervoort def.  Javier Barranco Cosano /  Sergio Martos Gornés 6–3, 6–7(7–9), [10–7].

References

2021
2021 ATP Challenger Tour
2021 in Spanish tennis
September 2021 sports events in Spain